Bill Donaldson was a Scotland international rugby union player.

Rugby union career

Amateur career
He also played for West of Scotland FC.

Provincial career
He was capped for Glasgow District in 1898.

International career

Referee career
After his playing career Donaldson became a rugby union referee. He was the first referee to referee a test in South Africa.

References

1871 births
1923 deaths
Glasgow District (rugby union) players
Rugby union players from Glasgow
Scotland international rugby union players
Scottish rugby union players
Scottish rugby union referees
West of Scotland FC players